Ekaterini Xagorari (born June 21, 1964, Athens, Greece) is the Greek Ambassador to Switzerland and non resident Ambassador to the Principality of Liechtenstein.  She had served as Ambassador to Australia (February 24, 2016 – October 16, 2019) with non resident Ambassador to New Zealand, Republic of Fiji, Papua New Guinea, Solomon Islands, Vanuatu, Kiribati, Nauru, Samoa and Tonga.

References

Greek women ambassadors
Ambassadors of Greece to Australia
Ambassadors of Greece to Switzerland
Ambassadors of Greece to Fiji
Ambassadors of Greece to Liechtenstein
Ambassadors of Greece to Papua New Guinea
Ambassadors of Greece to the Solomon Islands
Ambassadors of Greece to Vanuatu
Ambassadors of Greece to Kiribati
Ambassadors of Greece to Nauru
Ambassadors of Greece to Samoa
Ambassadors of Greece to Tonga
1964 births
Living people